Chahamanas may refer to:

The ruling dynasties belonging to the Chauhan clan included–

Chahamanas of Shakambhari (Chauhans of Ajmer) (c. 551 – 1194 CE)
 Chahamanas of Naddula (Chauhans of Nadol) (c. 950 – 1197 CE)
 Chahamanas of Jalor (c. 1160 – 1311 CE), branched off from the Chahamanas of Naddula
 Chahamanas of Ranastambhapura (c. 1192 – 1301 CE), branched off from the Chahamanas of Shakambhari
 Chahamanas of Chandravati and Abu (Kingdom of Sirohi) (c. 1311 – 1949 CE)
 Chahamanas of Lata
 Chahamanas of Dholpur
 Chahamanas of Partabgarh
 Hada Chauhan kingdoms of Hadoti region are–
 Kingdom of Bundi (c. 1342 – 1949 CE)
 Kingdom of Kota (c. 1579 – 1948 CE)
 Kingdom of Jhalawar (c. 1838 – 1949 CE), branched off from the Kingdom of Kota in 1838 CE

See also
 Chauhan (surname)
 Prithviraj Chauhan (disambiguation)